Zoran Manević (1937 – 2019), is one of the most prominent Serbian architecture historians. He published a number of books in his field, and is a board member of Arhitektura i urbanizam magazine and president of the Club of Architects.

Bibliography
 Mihajlo Mitrović: izložba arhitekture (1971)
 Zlokovićev put u modernizam (1976)
 Arhitektura i politika : (1937–1941) (1984)
 Arhitektura XX vijeka (1986)
 Graditelji (1986)
 Tradicija i savremeno srpsko crkveno graditeljstvo (1995)
 Aleksandar Đokić (1995)
 Stojan Maksimović: stvaralaštvo (2006)

References

Living people
Architecture writers
1937 births